Nitzanim (lit. Flower buds) is a kibbutz in southern Israel. Located between Ashkelon and Ashdod on the Nitzanim dunes, it falls under the jurisdiction of Hof Ashkelon Regional Council.

History
Nitzanim was established on 8 December 1943 on a 400-acre plot of land purchased by the Jewish National Fund in 1942. On the grounds was a large building that became known as the "mansion." The first residents were new immigrants, some of them Holocaust survivors.

The kibbutz was bombarded and captured by the Egyptian army during the 1948 Arab–Israeli War in the Battle of Nitzanim. Of Nitzanim's 141 members, 37 were killed and many were taken prisoner.

Following the war, the kibbutz was moved four kilometres south of the original location, onto the land of the newly depopulated Palestinian village of Hamama.

The original site of the kibbutz became Nitzanim Youth Village in 1949. After the youth village closed in 1990,  the community settlement of Nitzan was founded there.

See also
Nizzanim culture, Neolithic culture named after the type-site at Nitzanim

References

External links
[http://www.knitzanim.com Official website</ref>
the battle of nitzanim, exhibition in the Idf& defense establishment archives

Kibbutzim
Populated places established in 1943
Jewish villages depopulated during the 1948 Arab–Israeli War
Populated places in Southern District (Israel)
1943 establishments in Mandatory Palestine